Peiman Maheripour (Persian: پیمان ماهری‌پور) (born 15 October 1987) is an Iranian Strongman and powerlifter.

Strongman career
He got the second place in Iran's Strongest Man in 2018.

He is the third Iranian athlete (after Soltaan Bathaiee in 2005 and Reza Gharaei in 2006) who could compete in World's Strongest Man event in 2017.

In 2017 World's Strongest Man, he competed in Heat 5 together with Zydrunas Savickas, Nick Best, Terry Hollands, Bryan Benzel and Oluwatofunmi Fadesire. By placing third in his group, he could not reach the grand final. At the 2018 World's Strongest Man, he again failed to reach the finals.

His deadlift record is 492 kg in training.

References

1987 births
Living people
Iranian strength athletes
Iranian powerlifters
People from Ardabil